Cox River may refer to:

Cox River, Queensland, Australia
Cox River, New Zealand

See also
 Coxs River, New South Wales, Australia